Both Sides Live is a 2-CD live album by American rock band the Hooters, released in November 2008.

Background
Both Sides Live contains 25 tracks recorded live in Philadelphia, with 13 songs being electric songs recorded at the Electric Factory on November 21 and 23, 2007 during the band's traditional Thanksgiving holiday concerts, and 12 acoustic songs recorded on February 28 and March 1, 2008 at keyboard player Rob Hyman's Elm Street Studios in front of a small studio audience.

Track listing

Personnel
Adapted from the album liner notes.

The Hooters
Eric Bazilian – lead vocals, guitar, mandolin, recorder, harmonica, banjo
Rob Hyman – lead vocals, keyboards, accordion, melodica
David Uosikkinen – drums, percussion
John Lilley – guitar, mandolin, dobro
Fran Smith Jr. – bass, backing vocals

Additional musician
Ann Marie Calhoun - violin, backing vocals (Secret Sessions)

Technical
Eric Bazilian – producer, mixing, additional engineer
Rob Hyman – producer, mixing
Michael Comstock – engineer (Electric Factory)
Michael Richelle – assistant engineer (Electric Factory)
John O. Senior – engineer (Secret Sessions), mixing
Bill Hayward – assistant engineer (Secret Sessions)
Daniel Chertoff – assistant engineer (Secret Sessions)
Rick Chertoff – "production guru" (Secret Sessions)
Paul Hammond – "technical guru" (Secret Sessions)
George Marino – mastering (at Sterling Sound)
Graham Perry/NCS Studios – art direction, design
Mark Tassoni – photography (Electric Factory)
Brigitte Morgenstern – photography (Electric Factory)
Thomas Collins – photography (Electric Factory)
Jan Klug-Offermann – photography (Electric Factory)
Dani Heim – photography (Secret Sessions)

References

The Hooters albums
Albums produced by Eric Bazilian
Albums produced by Rob Hyman
2008 live albums